Love Songs is a compilation album of romantic songs by the American band Chicago, their twenty-ninth album overall, released in 2005 through Rhino Records.

Featuring a sampling of many of their love songs over the course of their long career, this set spans from their 1969 debut album to two exclusive new live recordings with Earth, Wind & Fire in 2004. Curiously enough, versions released outside of the US also include solo efforts by former member Peter Cetera, songs never recorded by the band.

Released in January 2005 in time for the Valentine's Day market, Love Songs managed to reach #57 in the US album charts.

Track listing
"You're the Inspiration" (Peter Cetera/David Foster) – 3:48
"If You Leave Me Now" (Live in 2004) (Cetera) – 4:14
 A new live recording in August 2004 featuring Philip Bailey of Earth, Wind & Fire on lead vocals
"Hard to Say I'm Sorry/Get Away" (Cetera/Foster/Robert Lamm) – 5:06
"Here in My Heart" (James Newton Howard/Glen Ballard) – 4:14
"Call on Me" (Lee Loughnane) – 4:03
"Colour My World" (James Pankow) – 3:02
"Just You 'n' Me" (Pankow) – 3:42
"After the Love Has Gone" (Live in 2004) (Bill Champlin/Foster/Jay Graydon) – 5:19
 A new live recording of Earth, Wind and Fire's 1979 hit, featuring Bill Champlin - the song's co-writer - on lead vocals
"Hard Habit to Break" (Steve Kipner/Jon Parker) – 4:45
"Look Away" (Diane Warren) – 4:01
"Beginnings" (Lamm) – 6:27
 Edited version
"Happy Man" (Cetera) – 3:15
"Will You Still Love Me?" (Foster/Tom Keane/Richard Baskin) – 4:12
"No Tell Lover" (Loughnane/Danny Seraphine/Cetera) – 3:50
"I Don't Wanna Live Without Your Love" (Warren/Albert Hammond) – 3:56
"Never Been in Love Before" (Lamm) – 4:10
"What Kind of Man Would I Be?" (Jason Scheff/Chas Sanford/Bobby Caldwell) – 4:14
"Wishing You Were Here" (Cetera) – 4:36

Love Songs (Rhino 78451) reached No. 57 in the US during a chart run of three weeks.

International release
"You're the Inspiration" (Cetera/Foster) – 3:48
"If You Leave Me Now" (Live in 2004) (Cetera) – 4:14
 A new live recording in August 2004 featuring Philip Bailey of Earth, Wind & Fire on lead vocals
"Saturday in the Park" (Lamm) – 3:56
"Hard to Say I'm Sorry/Get Away" (Cetera/Foster/Lamm) – 5:06
"Here in My Heart" (Howard/Ballard) – 4:14
"Call on Me" (Loughnane) – 4:03
"Colour My World" (Pankow) – 3:02
"Glory of Love" - Peter Cetera (Cetera/Foster/Diane Nini) – 4:20
"After the Love Has Gone" (Live in 2004) (Champlin/Foster/Graydon) – 5:19
 A new live recording of Earth, Wind and Fire's 1979 hit, featuring Bill Champlin - the song's co-writer - on lead vocals
"Hard Habit to Break" (Kipner/Parker) – 4:45
"Look Away" (Warren) – 4:01
"Beginnings" (Lamm) – 6:27
 Edited version
"The Next Time I Fall" - Peter Cetera & Amy Grant (Caldwell/Paul Gordon) – 3:43
"Will You Still Love Me?" (Foster/Keane/Baskin) – 4:12
"No Tell Lover" (Loughnane/Seraphine/Cetera) – 3:50
"I Don't Wanna Live Without Your Love" (Warren/Hammond) – 3:56
"What Kind of Man Would I Be?" (Scheff/Sanford/Caldwell) – 4:14
"Just You 'n' Me" (Pankow) – 3:42
"If You Leave Me Now" (Original 1976 version) (Cetera) – 3:56

Personnel

Matthew Abels – project assistant
Karen Ahmed – compilation producer
Hugh Brown – art direction, design, photography
Chicago – producer
Reggie Collins – project assistant
David Donnelly – mastering, mixing
Mike Engstrom – compilation producer
David Foster – producer
Cory Frye – project assistant
A. Scott Galloway – liner notes
James William Guercio – producer
Jon Heintz – mixing
James Newton Howard – producer
Robin Hurley – compilation producer
Karen LeBlanc – project assistant
Lee Loughnane – producer
Jeff Magid – audio engineer
Ron Nevison – producer
Bob O'Neill – project assistant
Randy Perry – project assistant
Gary Peterson – project assistant
Phil Ramone – producer
Chas Sandford – producer
Maria Villar – art direction, design

Charts

References

Albums produced by Bruce Fairbairn
Albums produced by Phil Ramone
Albums produced by James William Guercio
Albums produced by David Foster
Albums produced by Ron Nevison
Chicago (band) compilation albums
2005 compilation albums
Rhino Records compilation albums